Rectification movement may refer to:

 Yan'an Rectification Movement, first ideological mass movement initiated by the Chinese Communist Party
 First Great Rectification Movement, 1965 ideological movement by the Communist Party of the Philippines
 Second Great Rectification Movement, 1992 ideological movement by the Communist Party of the Philippines

See also
 Rectification (disambiguation)